Sannomysk is a rural locality (a selo) in Khorinsky District, Republic of Buryatia, Russia. The population was 408 as of 2010. There are 24 streets.

Geography 
Sannomysk is located 30 km west of Khorinsk (the district's administrative centre) by road. Naryn is the nearest rural locality.

References 

Rural localities in Khorinsky District